Monica Sileoni (born ) is a retired Finnish female artistic gymnast, representing her nation at international competitions. 

She competed at world championships, including the 2015 World Artistic Gymnastics Championships in Glasgow.

Sileoni's paternal grandfather is Italian and paternal grandmother Argentine.

References

External links

1999 births
Living people
Finnish female artistic gymnasts
Place of birth missing (living people)
Gymnasts at the 2014 Summer Youth Olympics
Finnish people of Italian descent
Finnish people of Argentine descent
21st-century Finnish women